Long Stratton is a town and civil parish in Norfolk, England. It historically consisted of two villages; the larger, Stratton St. Mary, is to the south, and the other, Stratton St. Michael, is to the north. It had a population of 4,424 in the 2011 Census. South Norfolk Council are based in the town.

Location
The town is situated halfway between Norwich and Diss; along a Roman built road, now known as the A140 (it was originally known as Pye Road) – which runs from Cromer (North Norfolk) to Ipswich (Suffolk).

Long Stratton borders five other parishes: Tharston and Hapton, Tasburgh, Morningthorpe and Fritton, Pulham Market, and Wacton.

History
The name 'Stratton' means 'farm/settlement on a Roman road'.

Stratton St Mary & St Michael is recorded in the Domesday Book with 127 households belonging to nine different landowners.
One of the ancient parishes that make up the modern town of Long Stratton was served by St Michael's church, whose rector from 1779 to 1823, Francis Wickham Swanton, was an Oxford contemporary of the celebrated Parson James Woodforde. The Blennerhasett family, later prominent in the Plantation of Ulster, were Lords of the Manor in the sixteenth century.

The church contains a rare example of a Sexton's wheel. The only other example in the country is claimed to be at Yaxley, Suffolk.

Long Stratton has two Church of England churches (St Mary and St Michael), as well as a Methodist church. The church of Long Stratton St Mary (see right) is one of 124 existing round-tower churches in Norfolk.

The town was struck by an F1/T2 tornado on 23 November 1981, as part of the record-breaking nationwide tornado outbreak on that day.

Between 1330 and 1340 GMT on 14 December 1989 a tornado caused damage along a track of at least 5 km in length by 100 metres in width through the south Norfolk villages of North Moulton, Wacton and Long Stratton. As many as 100 buildings were damaged in Long Stratton by this T4 intensity tornado but only one person was injured. The tornado formed from a fast-moving storm cell which developed behind a slowly-moving occluded front around the time that a secondary low was progressing along the front. The tornado developed at the forward edge of the storm suggesting it was triggered either by shearing instability along the leading edge of the thunderstorm outflow (gust front) or as a consequence of interaction of gust fronts from adjacent storm cells.

Demographics
According to the 2001 United Kingdom Census, Long Stratton CP was home to 3,701 people, who resided in a total of 1,598 dwellings. The statistics further confirm that Long Stratton is used as a commuter town, with the average employed person travelling 17.25 miles to their place of work. The population increased to 4,424 by 2011.

Governance
Long Stratton is part of the electoral ward of Stratton. This ward had a population of 5,519 at the 2011 census.

Town status
There is a parish council and it was granted town status in 2018. with the first elections to the new 13-member town council on 2 May 2019. The Area Action Plan, a planning document, envisages a town centre to develop together with the planned increase in residents and the completion of a by-pass.

Facilities and amenities

The town has three schools: Long Stratton High School, Manor Field Infant school and St. Mary's church of England junior school.

Shopping facilities are located along the main street which runs through the town as well as in two small shopping centres (South Norfolk Shopping Precinct and The Icehouse Precinct).  There are also two public houses (The Queen's Head and The Swan). Long Stratton also has a doctors surgery, as well as a leisure centre operated by South Norfolk Council.

Transport

Bypass proposals
There has been cause for the building of a bypass around Long Stratton for over 60 years. Builders of the new "Churchfields" housing estate to the east of the town proposed to build a bypass as part of the submission for planning permission in the mid-1990s, though this was rejected by the Highways Agency on the grounds that the planned road was not of a sufficiently high standard to redesignate it as part of the main A140 trunk road.

2006 was supposed to bring about the construction of the new bypass by Norfolk County Council, who had assumed responsibility for the A140 from the Highways Agency in 2001.

There was considerable opposition to the bypass on either side of the A140, by residents of the village of Tharston to the west, and those of the hamlet of Wood Green Common to the east. Eventually, it was decided that a bypass to the east would have less environmental impact.

The total cost of the three miles stretch of dual carriageway, with a roundabout at either end, was estimated to be £21.8m (2004) – compared to earlier estimates of £6m to £16m (2002).

Following the May 2005 elections, the planning suffered a one-year delay, when changes to the planning permission laws meant that the application for the permission of the bypass had to be resubmitted.

Subsequent changes to the way in which local road building projects are prioritised and funded have led to a decision to suspend construction of the bypass until 2016 at the earliest, despite Norfolk County Council already having spent over £1m on site preparation and legal fees. This led local resident Jason Bunn to establish an online petition on the Prime Minister's website calling for the funding to be made available immediately. Local MP Richard Bacon also joined in the campaign, lobbying Transport Secretary Alistair Darling and Roads Minister Stephen Ladyman for a change in the decision.

As of 2018 construction has still not begun, but new house building proposals are set to include a single carriageway by-pass road to the east of the town.

Bus services
Several operators run bus services to Norwich and Diss.

Railway station proposal
The Great Eastern Main Line passes  to the western edge of the town, but there have been no railway stations in the area since Forncett station closed in 1966.  Railfuture East Anglia is campaigning for a new station to be opened, which would be five minutes away by car from the town centre.

Notable residents
Charles Henville Bayly, cricketer and rector of Stratton St Michael between 1839 and 1873
Margaret Lumley Brown, occult figure and leader of the Fraternity of the Inner Light from 1946
Sir Owen Wansbrough-Jones, army officer, leading academic chemist, and Chief Scientist to the Ministry of Supply between 1953 and 1959

References

External links

St Mary's on the European Round Tower Churches website
Long Stratton Council
Information from Genuki Norfolk on Long Stratton.

 
Towns in Norfolk
Civil parishes in Norfolk
South Norfolk